Agnibesa venusta is a moth in the family Geometridae first described by William Warren in 1897. It is found in Sikkim in India, Nepal and China.

References

Moths described in 1897
Asthenini
Moths of Asia